Vacuum arc remelting (VAR) is a secondary melting process for production of metal ingots with elevated chemical and mechanical homogeneity for highly demanding applications.  The VAR process has revolutionized the specialty traditional metallurgical techniques industry, and has made possible tightly-controlled materials used in biomedical, aviation and aerospace.

Overview
VAR is used most frequently in high value applications. It is an additional processing step to improve the quality of metal.  Because it is time consuming and expensive, a majority of commercial alloys do not employ the process.  Nickel, titanium, and specialty steels are materials most often processed with this method.  The conventional path for production of titanium alloys includes single, double or even triple VAR processing.  Use of this technique over traditional methods presents several advantages:

The solidification rate of molten material can be tightly controlled.  This allows a high degree of control over the microstructure as well as the ability to minimize segregation
The gases dissolved in liquid metal during melting metals in open furnaces, such as nitrogen, oxygen and hydrogen are considered to be detrimental to the majority of steels and alloys. Under vacuum conditions these gases escape from liquid metal.
Elements with high vapor pressure such as carbon, sulfur, and magnesium (frequently contaminants) are lowered in concentration.
Centerline porosity and segregation are eliminated.
Certain metals and alloys, such as Ti, cannot be melted in open air furnaces

Process description
The alloy to undergo VAR is formed into a cylinder typically by vacuum induction melting (VIM) or ladle refining (airmelt).  This cylinder, referred to as an electrode is then put into a large cylindrical enclosed crucible and brought to a metallurgical vacuum.  At the bottom of the crucible is a small amount of the alloy to be remelted, which the top electrode is brought close to prior to starting the melt.  Several kiloamperes of DC current are used to start an arc between the two pieces, thus a continuous melt is derived.  The crucible (typically made of copper) is surrounded by a water jacket to cool the melt and control the solidification rate.  To prevent arcing between the electrode and the crucible walls, the diameter of the crucible is larger than the electrode.  As a result, the electrode must be lowered as the melt consumes it.  Control of the current, cooling water, and electrode gap is essential to effective control of the process and production of defect-free material.

Ideally, the melt rate stays constant throughout the process cycle, but monitoring and control of the vacuum arc remelting process is not simple.  This is because there is a complex heat transfer occurring involving conduction, radiation, convection within the liquid metal, and advection caused by the Lorentz force.  Ensuring the consistency of the melt process in terms of pool geometry, and melt rate is crucial in ensuring the best possible properties of the alloy.

Materials and applications
The VAR process is used on many different materials. Certain applications almost always use a material that has been VAR treated. A list of materials that may be VAR treated include:

Stainless Steel
15-5
13-8
17-4
304
316
Alloy Steel
9310
4340 & 4330+V
300M
AF1410
Aermet 100
M50
BG42
Nitralloy
16NCD13
35NCD16
HY-100
HY-180
HY-TUF
D6AC
Maraging steels
UT-18
HP 9-4-30
Titanium
Ti-6Al-4V
Ti-10V-2Al-3Fe
Ti-5Al-5V-5Mo-3Cr
Invar
Nitinol
Nickel superalloys
Inconel alloys
Hastelloy alloys
Rene alloys
RR1000
Zirconium
Niobium
Platinum
Tantalum
Rhodium

Note that pure titanium and most titanium alloys are double or triple VAR processed. Nickel-based super alloys for aerospace applications are usually VAR processed. Zirconium and niobium alloys used in the nuclear industry are routinely VAR processed. Pure platinum, tantalum, and rhodium may be VAR processed.

See also
Electro-slag remelting
Vacuum arc
Vacuum metallurgy

References

Further reading
Britannica

Steelmaking
Metallurgical processes